Kaj Gunnar Wolter Mattsson (5 May 1937 – 9 August 1989) was a Swedish-speaking Finnish writer and journalist. Mattsson rose to fame as a result of his book Prinsessan. The book was translated into some thirty languages, including English, it was a bestseller in Finland and was filmed as A Time in the Sun in Sweden.

Biography 
Mattsson was born in Helsinki. He worked as a journalist for Hufvudstadsbladet newspaper. Suffering from alcoholism, he committed suicide at the age of 52 in Helsinki.

References

Further reading
 
 

20th-century Finnish writers
1937 births
1989 suicides
Suicides in Finland
Thanks for the Book Award winners